Bread and Roses, Too is a 2006 children's historical novel written by American novelist Katherine Paterson. Set in Lawrence, Massachusetts, in 1912 in the aftermath of the Lawrence Textile Strike (also known as the Bread and Roses Strike), the book focuses on the Italian-born daughter of mill workers who finds herself becoming the protector of a boy who is afraid to return home to his abusive father.

References

2006 American novels
American children's novels
American young adult novels
Children's historical novels

Fiction set in 1912
Novels set in the 1910s
Novels set in Massachusetts
Lawrence, Massachusetts
2006 children's books
Clarion Books books